Roberto Maurantonio (born 7 June 1981) is an Italian former football goalkeeper.

Career
Maurantonio started his career in 1999 with Locorotondo of the Province of Bari before going on to play for Martina, Ascoli, Lanciano, Piacenza and Grosseto across levels 5 to 2 of Italian football,  playing 44 times for Ascoli, across five spells at the club. In October 2014, Maurantonio joined Carpi in Serie B until the end of the season.

References

External links
  
 
 

1981 births
Footballers from Bari
Living people
Italian footballers
Association football goalkeepers
A.S. Martina Franca 1947 players
Ascoli Calcio 1898 F.C. players
S.S. Virtus Lanciano 1924 players
Piacenza Calcio 1919 players
F.C. Grosseto S.S.D. players
A.C. Carpi players
S.S. Akragas Città dei Templi players
Taranto F.C. 1927 players
S.S. Fidelis Andria 1928 players
S.S.C. Bari players
Serie B players
Serie C players
Serie D players